Blümlisalp or Blüemlisalp is a paddle-wheel steamer built in 1906, used in regular passenger service on Lake Thun. She is named after the Blüemlisalp mountain massif in the Bernese Oberland. The vessel is operated by BLS AG.

Construction and description
The saloon steamer was ordered in 1905 by the Oberländische Dampfschifffahrts-Gesellschaft at the company Escher, Wyss & Co. in Zurich, one of the foremost builders of locomotives and industrial machinery at the time. Ordered at a price of 375,000 Swiss francs, Blümlisalp was destined to overpass all other ships on Lake Thun and Lake Brienz in terms of size, power and elegance. The ship carries 800 passengers. Blümlisalp's engine, is an inclined compound marine steam engine..

History
On August 1, 1971 Blümlisalp was put out of service and was slated to be scrapped. For about twenty years, the ship remained moored in the delta of the Kander River. A cooperative called "Vaporama" undertook a revision of the ship, and after more than two years of repairs and overhaul, the second maiden voyage took place on May 22, 1992. Ever since, Blümlisalp has been serving in scheduled passenger traffic between April and October.

References

Steamboats in Europe
Lake Thun
1906 ships